Sidebar may refer to:

 Sidebar (publishing)
 Sidebar (law)
 Sidebar (computing), a type of graphical user interface element
  Windows Sidebar, in Windows Vista (rename Windows Desktop Gadgets in Windows 7)
  Bing Sidebar, a section of the search engine results display screen for social networking 
 Sidebar, a longitudinal elastic wooden bar on some buggies and other light vehicles
Sidebars, a Grammy-winning album by Eartha